Hōhepa Te Umuroa (1820? – 19 July 1847) was a notable New Zealander and political prisoner. Of Māori descent, he identified with the Te Ati Haunui-a-Paparangi iwi.

The story of Te Umuroa's capture and subsequent transportation and imprisonment in Tasmania for insurrection is told in The Trowenna Sea by Witi Ihimaera and the 2012 opera Hōhepa composed by Jenny McLeod. Te Umuroa died of tuberculosis in Tasmania, and was buried on Maria Island. His remains were repatriated to Whanganui, New Zealand in 1988.

Portraits 
During Te Umuroa's imprisonment on Tasmania's Maria Island, John Skinner Prout and William Duke painted his portrait.

References

1847 deaths
New Zealand prisoners and detainees
Convicts transported to Australia
19th-century deaths from tuberculosis
Te Āti Haunui-a-Pāpārangi people
Year of birth uncertain
Tuberculosis deaths in Australia
Infectious disease deaths in Tasmania